Cardamine pensylvanica is a species of Cardamine known by the common name Pennsylvania bittercress. It is native to most of Canada and the United States from coast to coast.

Ecology and description
It is generally found in moist to wet areas, such as the mud on riverbanks. The leaves are hairless and divided into several rounded to oval lobes, each of which has one or two lobes, with the exception of the large terminal leaflet at the tip, which generally has three. Most of the leaves are located along the stem and there is no basal rosette. The inflorescence comprises many flowers, each with four white petals a few millimeters long, blossoming from April to October.

Consumption
All parts of Cardamine pensylvanica are considered edible. Young leaves can be eaten raw, while older leaves should be cooked; they have a peppery flavor. Seed pods are good raw, stir fried, or pickled, before seeds mature and harden. Roots can be mixed with vinegar to make a good horseradish substitute.

References

External links
Jepson Manual Treatment
USDA Plants Profile
Missouri Plants
Illinois Wildflowers
Photo gallery

Flora of North America
pensylvanica
Plants described in 1800
Taxa named by Gotthilf Heinrich Ernst Muhlenberg